Mutske Lake is a lake in Campbell County, South Dakota, in the United States. It is impounded by the Matzke Lake Dam.

The dam has the name of Berthold Matzke, a pioneer who settled at the lake.

See also
List of lakes in South Dakota

References

Lakes of South Dakota
Bodies of water of Campbell County, South Dakota